Baie Lazare is an administrative district of Seychelles located on the island of Mahé.  It is named after the explorer Lazare Picault.

References

Districts of Seychelles
Mahé, Seychelles